The 1981 Australian Sports Car Championship was a CAMS sanctioned Australian motor racing title open to Group D Production Sports Cars.  It was the thirteenth Australian Sports Car Championship and the last to be restricted to cars complying with Group D regulations. The championship was won by John Latham, driving a Porsche Turbo.

Schedule
The championship was contested over a four-round series with Rounds 1, 2 and 3 each staged over two heats and Round 4 run as a single race.

Class structure
Cars competed in two engine capacity classes:
 Class A - Over 2000cc
 Class B - Up to and including 2000cc

Points system
Championship points were awarded on a 9-6-4-3-2-1 basis for the first six placings in each class at each round. Bonus points were awarded on a 4-3-2-1 basis for the top four placings irrespective of class at each round.

Where rounds were run in multiple parts, drivers were allocated points on a 20-16-13-11-10-9-8-7-6-5-4-3-2-1 basis for the first fourteen positions in each part. These points were then aggregated to determine the placings for that round.

Championship standings

References

External links
 Baskerville Raceway Photo Catalogue & Race Program Entry Listings, oldmotorsportphotos.com.au

Australian Sports Car Championship
Sports Car Championship